Red Bull Salzburg may refer to:
FC Red Bull Salzburg, association football club
EC Red Bull Salzburg, ice hockey club